Thee Undatakerz were an American hip hop group composed of Reverand Tom (Kool Keith), Al Bury-U (BIG NONAME), M-Balmer and The Funeral Director. They were signed to Activate Entertainment.

History 
The group was formed by Kool Keith in 2003 with members Al Bury-U (a.k.a. BIGNONAME), M-Balmer and The Funeral Director as well as Kool Keith himself, who adopted the persona of Reverand Tom. The group released their debut album, Kool Keith Presents Thee Undatakerz on May 11, 2004. The album was not a huge commercial success but did feature the semi-successful single, "Party in tha Morgue", which would later appear on the soundtrack for Blade: Trinity. Kool Keith Presents Thee Undatakerz has thus far been the only album released by the group. It is unknown whether the group will return.

Discography

American hip hop groups
Musicians from New York City
Horrorcore groups
Musical groups established in 2003